Tibellus duttoni is a species of running crab spider in the family Philodromidae. It is found in the United States and Mexico.

References

Philodromidae
Articles created by Qbugbot
Spiders described in 1847